Ukraine competed at the 2014 Winter Olympics in Sochi, Russia, from 7 to 23 February 2014. The National Olympic Committee of Ukraine sent a total of 43 athletes.

The women's relay victory gave Ukraine its second Winter Games gold medal ever. The first was won by Oksana Baiul at the 1994 Winter Olympics. On 22 February, cross-country skier Marina Lisogor was excluded from the Olympics after testing positive for trimetazidine.

Competitors
The following is the list of number of competitors participating at the Games per sport/discipline.

Medalists

Alpine skiing 

Ukraine qualified 2 berths, one male and one female.

Biathlon 

Based on their performance at the 2012 and 2013 Biathlon World Championships, Ukraine qualified 5 men and 6 women.

Men

Women

Mixed

Cross-country skiing 

Ukraine qualified 7 berths.

Distance
Men

Women

Sprint
Men

Women

According to press reports Lisogor and Serdyuk had refused to start because they had been denied to wear black arm bands to honor those killed in the violent clashes Ukraine's capital Kyiv the previous day. The National Olympic Committee of Ukraine claimed Serdyuk was injured.

Figure skating 

Ukraine has achieved the following quota places:

Team trophy

Freestyle skiing 

Ukraine qualified 7 berths, three male and four female (all aerial).

Aerials

Luge 

Ukraine has qualified a total of six athletes and a spot in the team relay.

Nordic combined 

Ukraine qualified one male athlete.

Short track speed skating 

Ukraine qualified 1 woman in the 1000 m for the Olympics during World Cup 3 and 4 in November 2013.

Women

Qualification legend: ADV – Advanced due to being impeded by another skater; FA – Qualify to medal round; FB – Qualify to consolation round

Snowboarding 

Ukraine qualified 2 berths, one male and one female (all parallel).
Alpine

Concerns and controversies

On 19 February 2014, Ukrainian athletes asked for and were refused permission by the International Olympic Committee (IOC) to wear black armbands to honour those killed in the violent clashes in Ukraine's capital Kyiv on the previous day. According to IOC spokesman Mark Adams, "They weren't forbidden to wear armbands. The Ukrainian NOC met with IOC officials informally yesterday. They discussed what should be done, and they reached the conclusion there were other ways of marking this moment. Some athletes have taken other views and other ways of doing things". IOC president Thomas Bach offered his condolences "to those who have lost loved ones in these tragic events".

Alpine skier Bohdana Matsotska refused to participate further at the Olympic Games in protest against the violence. She and her father posted a message on Facebook stating, "In solidarity with the fighters on the barricades of the Maidan, and as a protest against the criminal actions made towards the protesters, the irresponsibility of the president and his issues with the government, we refuse further performance at the Olympic Games in Sochi 2014". Matsotska was reportedly followed by about thirty Ukrainian athletes who left Sochi and returned to their country (mostly after having competed), leaving a dozen present at the Games.

On 20 February 2014, the Ukrainian NOC reported that as many as half of the Ukrainian athletes at the Olympics had left the games to return home. But according to Ukrainian NOC president Sergey Bubka they had returned home in compliance with their original schedule, and their departure was thus not related to the riots in Kyiv. According to Bubka, the remaining athletes did plan to participate in the closing ceremony. In a statement on 20 February 2014, the Ukrainian team had expressed condolences for the dead and stated, "We are thinking about our families and loved ones back home in Ukraine, and we are doing our best to honour them on the fields of play here in Sochi. We appeal for peace and mutual understanding to find a positive way forward for Ukraine".

Figure skater Natalia Popova stated after finishing her figure skating short program on 20 February, "That’s very unfortunate because you just want peace everywhere. But all I can do is just focus on my performance and, hopefully, my skating can inspire the people back in Ukraine to be more peaceful with each other". Olympic biathlete Olena Pidhrushna at a news conference after her women's relay victory asked for a minute's silence in memory of the people who died in Kyiv.

See also
Ukraine at the 2014 Summer Youth Olympics

References

External links 
Ukraine at the 2014 Winter Olympics

Nations at the 2014 Winter Olympics
2014
Winter Olympics